Solimonas aquatica is a Gram-negative, aerobic, rod-shaped, non-spore-forming and motile bacterium from the genus of Solimonas which has been isolated from a water spring from Kaohsiung in Taiwan.

References

Bacteria described in 2011
Gammaproteobacteria